The Howd-Linsley House is a historic house at 1795 Middletown Avenue in the Northford area of North Branford, Connecticut.  Of uncertain 18th-century construction, it is a candidate as the oldest surviving building in the town, and a good example of period residential architecture.  It was listed on the National Register of Historic Places in 1986.

Description and history
The Howd-Linsley House is located in northern North Branford, on the south side of Middletown Avenue (Connecticut Route 17) at its junction with Sol's Path, a private lane. It is a -story wood-frame structure, with a gabled roof, central chimney, and clapboarded exterior. The rear roof face extends to the first floor, giving the house a classic New England saltbox profile. The front facade has an irregular arrangement of windows around a center entrance, which is simply framed and sheltered by a projecting hood. The interior retains many original finishes, and exposes some of its main framing elements, allowing a construction sequence to be reconstructed.

The house's date of initial construction is not known, but its architecture is suggestive of multiple construction periods spanning different eras of the 18th century.  A core portion of the house was probably built early in the century, including its massive chimney, with the leanto in the rear added later.  The building underwent a restoration in 1928, when a number of 19th-century additions were removed.

See also
National Register of Historic Places listings in New Haven County, Connecticut

References

Houses on the National Register of Historic Places in Connecticut
National Register of Historic Places in New Haven County, Connecticut
Colonial architecture in the United States
North Branford, Connecticut